Biju (Malayalam: ബിജു) is a popular male name in India, especially in Bengal, Orissa, Kerala, and Bangladesh.

Biju is derived from the similar rhyming name Viju. It is highly likely that Viju is an affectionate version of the name Vijaya, which means Victory in Sanskrit and several Indian languages. It has a similar meaning in Chinese as well. Biju is associated with Arjuna, the great warrior hero of the Mahabharatha.

In Kerala, the name Biju is used by all communities: Hindus, Christians, and Muslims, and thus is a secular name, although many have added suffixes which indicate their caste or community. For example, Biju Cheriya Othayoth Eramala (ബിജു ചെറിയ ഒതയോത്  ബാലകൃഷ്ണൻ  ഏറാമല ), in which ബിജു  is the first name, ബാലകൃഷ്ണൻ  is the first letter of father's name and ചെറിയ ഒതയോത് is the house name.

This name also may have derived from the French word "bijou" (pronounced "bizhu"), meaning "jewel."

People with the given name
 Biju Mathew (fl. 1998–present), American Marxist intellectual
 Biju Menon (b. 1970), Indian film actor
 Biju Narayanan (fl. 1992–present), Indian playback singer
 Biju Patnaik (1916-1997), Indian politician, founder of Biju Janata Dal party
 Biju Phukan (fl. 1970–present), Indian Assamese actor
 Biju Toppo (fl. 1995–present), Indian documentary filmmaker
 Biju Viswanath (fl. 1998–present), Indian film director
 Bijukumar Damodaran, known as Dr. Biju (born 1971), Indian film director

People with the surname
 Sathyabhama Das Biju (b. 1963), Indian biologist

Indian masculine given names